South Nowra is a suburb of Nowra in the City of Shoalhaven in New South Wales, Australia. It lies south of Nowra on both sides of the Princes Highway. It includes a strip of light industry along the highway.

References

City of Shoalhaven